Four Dan actresses (四旦 or 四大名旦 or 四小名旦 or 四大花旦 or 四小花旦) were regarded as the four most bankable young actresses from Mainland China. Guangzhou Daily editorial first used the term to reference modern Chinese actresses Zhang Ziyi, Zhao Wei, Zhou Xun, and Xu Jinglei in July 2000, when they were all in their 20s. It gained widespread use in China thereafter following a series of interviews on Southern Metropolis Daily from December 2001 to January 2002. As expected, the four actresses dominated Chinese cinema in the following decade with varying degrees of success.

Originally, a Dan was a male actor who portrayed a leading female character in Peking opera. The term "Four Dan" was first coined in the 1920s to refer to four extremely popular Dan actors: Mei Lanfang, Cheng Yanqiu, Shang Xiaoyun, and Xun Huisheng.

The Big Four Dan actresses
 Xu Jinglei (born 1974), graduate of Beijing Film Academy, gained fame through A Sentimental Story (1998 TV series) and Cherish Our Love Forever (1999 TV series)
 Zhou Xun (born 1974), graduate of Zhejiang Vocational Academy of Art, gained fame through Palace of Desire (2000 TV series) and Suzhou River (2000 film)
 Vicky Zhao (born 1976), graduate of Beijing Film Academy, gained fame through My Fair Princess (1998-1999 TV series)
 Zhang Ziyi (born 1979), graduate of Central Academy of Drama, gained fame through The Road Home (1999 film) and Crouching Tiger, Hidden Dragon (2000 film)

Sometimes Li Bingbing and Fan Bingbing, two mainland actresses who had similar levels of success in the first decade of 2000s, were mentioned along with the group as "Four Dan and Two Bing" (四旦双冰). Shu Qi, a Taiwanese-Hong Kong actress who had also similar levels of success in the first decade of 2000s and Tang Wei, a Chinese actress who gained fame through Lust, Caution (2007). All of them were mentioned along with the group as "Four Dan Two Bing Qi Wei" (四旦双冰淇唯) or "Eight Big Dan actress" (八大旦).

New Four Dan actresses
From 2005,  the media and articles by publication companies have reported efforts to pick four new young actresses as the "New Four Dan actresses" (四小花旦).

2009 version by Tencent QQ
Eva Huang (born 1983), gained fame through Kung Fu Hustle and Fairy Couple.
Wang Luodan (born 1984), gained fame through Struggle and My Youthfulness.
Yang Mi (born 1986), gained fame through The Return of the Condor Heroes and Chinese Paladin 3.
Crystal Liu (born 1987), gained fame through The Return of the Condor Heroes and The Forbidden Kingdom.

2013 version by Southern Metropolis Daily 
Yang Mi (born 1986), gained fame through Palace and Painted Skin: The Resurrection. 
Cecilia Liu (born 1987), gained fame through Scarlet Heart and Xuan-Yuan Sword: Scar of Sky. 
Ni Ni (born 1988), gained fame through The Flowers of War.
Angelababy (born 1989), gained fame through Love in Space and Taichi 0.

Tiffany Tang and Zanilia Zhao, two mainland actresses who had similar levels of success post 2013, are usually associated with the new Four Dan Actresses of the 2013 list.

New Four Dan actresses of the "post-'90s" generation
In August 2016, Southern Metropolis Daily conducted a survey among 173 million netizens and 110 professional media and industry insiders. After a series of voting, four actresses who were born after the '90s (90后四小花旦) were picked.

Zheng Shuang (born 1991), gained fame through Meteor Shower and Mural.
Zhou Dongyu (born 1992), gained fame through The Love of the Hawthorn Tree and My Old Classmate. 
Yang Zi (born 1992), gained fame through Home with Kids and Battle of Changsha.
Guan Xiaotong (born 1997), gained fame through The Left Ear and To Be a Better Man.

New Four Dan actresses of the "post-'95s" generation
In January 2019, four young actresses who were born after the '95s (95后四小花旦) were picked by CCTV.

Zhang Zifeng (born 2001), gained fame through Aftershock and Go Brother!.
Vicky Chen (born 2003), gained fame through Angels Wear White and The Bold, the Corrupt, and the Beautiful. 
Guan Xiaotong (born 1997), gained fame through To Be a Better Man.
Sophie Zhang (born 1997), gained fame through Einstein and Einstein.

Ouyang Nana (born 2000), had similar levels of success post 2018–2019, is usually associated with the new Four Dan Actresses of the 2019 list.

Similar titles
In the early 1990s, Hong Kong's most popular male stars were collectively referred to as "Four Heavenly Kings" (Andy Lau, Jacky Cheung, Aaron Kwok and Leon Lai). Later Taiwan also introduced four male idols labelled "Four Younger Heavenly Kings" (Alec Su, Nicky Wu, Jimmy Lin and Takeshi Kaneshiro).

References

21st-century Chinese actresses
20th-century Chinese actresses
Chinese film actresses
Chinese culture